Elivelton is a given name. It may refer to:

 Elivélton (footballer, born 1971), Elivélton Alves Rufino, Brazilian football midfielder
 Elivélton (footballer, born January 1992), Elivelton José da Silva, Brazilian football defensive midfielder
 Elivélton (footballer, born May 1992), Elivélton Viana dos Santos, Brazilian football centre-back
 Elivelton (footballer, born 1995), Elivelton Ubiratan Oliveira de Lima, Brazilian football defender

See also
 Elivelto (born 1992), Elivelton Ribeiro Dantas, Brazilian football striker